Pátria Minha (English: My Homeland) is a Brazilian telenovela produced and broadcast by TV Globo. It premiered on 18 July 1994, replacing Fera Ferida and ended on 10 March 1995. It was created by Gilberto Braga and directed by Dennis Carvalho.

Cast

References

External links 
 

1994 telenovelas
Brazilian telenovelas
TV Globo telenovelas
1994 Brazilian television series debuts
1995 Brazilian television series endings
Telenovelas by Gilberto Braga
Portuguese-language telenovelas